Kenin may refer to:

History
Kenin (Japanese history) (家人, house person) third of the five lower castes of the Japanese ritsuryō system

People
Sofia Kenin (born 1998), American tennis player
Alexa Kenin (1962–1985), American actress

Entertainment
Kenin (band)